Tameka Empson (born 16 April 1977) is an English actress and comedian. She appeared as one of the three protagonists in the hidden-camera comedy sketch show 3 Non-Blondes. In 2009, she began portraying the role of Kim Fox in the BBC soap opera EastEnders.

Career
As well as her television work, Empson has appeared in a number of films. In 1996, she appeared in the film Beautiful Thing as Leah Russell, the next-door neighbour of the main characters. Empson worked alongside Linda Henry, both of whom would eventually join the cast of EastEnders; in 1998 she appeared as the love rival to the main character in the film Babymother. Empson is an experienced theatre actress having performed as Billie in the original cast of Our House, a musical featuring songs from the ska/pop band Madness, which premiered at The Cambridge Theatre in October 2002 and ran on until August 2003. She has since been a mainstay of the Hackney Empire annual pantomimes.

In 2008, Empson appeared in the BBC sitcom Beautiful People and in the ITV1 thriller Whitechapel. In 2009, she joined the cast of EastEnders, playing Kim Fox, the half-sister of Denise Fox (Diane Parish). As a result, she has won several awards including an Inside Soap award in 2012 for "Funniest Female Performance". She took maternity leave from EastEnders and returned to screens August 2014. On 16 July 2019, it was announced that Empson would be temporarily leaving the series, with her return set to air in 2020. Empson confirmed on Loose Women that the break was her maternity leave for her second child, and that she did not deliberately keep it a secret, but that she "just wanted to enjoy it".

Empson is a regular performer at the Hackney Empire starring in the theatre's annual pantomime since 2004; she has also starred in Anansi and the Magic Mirror and has a live sketch and comedy show (The Kat and Tameka Show) with Choice FM DJ Kat B. She has also voiced Tickbird in Tinga Tinga Tales. On 22 August 2016, Empson was revealed as a contestant participating on the fourteenth series of Strictly Come Dancing. She was partnered with professional dancer Gorka Márquez. They were the second couple to leave the competition. In 2019, she appeared on Comic Relief Does The Apprentice to raise money for Comic Relief. Later that year, she appeared as a panellist on The Apprentice: You're Fired, and voiced the role of Pearl the Police Horse on the Disney Channel series 101 Dalmatian Street.

Filmography

2019: 101 Dalmatian Street – Pearl the Police Horse
2016 Strictly Come Dancing – Participant 
2014: Lily's Driftwood Bay – Hatsie (2014)
2011: EastEnders: E20 – Kim Fox
2010: StreetDance 3D – Sharonda
2009: EastEnders – Kim Fox (653 episodes, 2009–present)
2008: Beautiful People – Tameka/Johoyo (6 episodes, 2008–2009)
2009: Skellig – Nurse 1
2009: Whitechapel – Mrs. Buki (3 episodes, 2009)
2007: Learners  – Gloria
2007: Mi High - Sergeant Raynor 
2006: Notes on a Scandal  – Antonia Robinson
2003: 3 Non Blondes – Herself
2002: Babyfather – Sherene (3 episodes, 2002)
2002: Silent Cry – Hairdresser
2002: Out of the Game – Karen
2002: Long Time Dead – Girl student
2001: The Martins – Mo
2001: Lava – Maxine
2001: Sam's Game – Marcia (6 episodes, 2001)
2001: Goodbye Charlie Bright – Kay
1998: Babymother – Dionne – her rival
1998: I Want You – Cut Ear Salon Woman
1997: Food of Love – Alice
1996: Beautiful Thing – Leah Russell

Awards and nominations

References

External links

 
 

1977 births
Alumni of the Anna Scher Theatre School
English stage actresses
English women comedians
Living people
Actresses from London
English television actresses
English soap opera actresses
English voice actresses
Black British actresses
English people of Jamaican  descent
20th-century British actresses
21st-century British actresses
20th-century English women
20th-century English people
21st-century English women
21st-century English people